Raymond Guell, better known as Ray Guell, is an American singer and composer of freestyle music. His biggest hits in music are "Love Will Come" and "Love Is the Answer", which reached numbers 22 and 32 respectively on the US Billboard Dance Club Songs chart.

Discography

Albums

Singles

References

Year of birth missing (living people)
Living people
American freestyle musicians
American male singers
Musicians from Miami